Thomas Gray (born August 12, 1986 in Red Bank, New Jersey) is an American soccer player.

Career

College
Gray attended Middletown High School South, played club ball with the Middletown Sonics (winning three state championships and one regional title in nine years) and played one year of college soccer for Rutgers University before transferring to Monmouth University as a sophomore. At Monmouth he was named to the First Team and Second Team of the Northeast Conference. In his junior year, Gray also led the nation in total assists.

In 2008, he was also on the roster of Newark Ironbound Express of the USL Premier Development League, but did not feature in any games due to a persistent injury.

Professional
Gray turned professional in 2009 when he signed with the Pittsburgh Riverhounds in the USL Second Division. He made his professional debut on April 17, 2009 in Pittsburgh's opening day 0–0 tie with Crystal Palace Baltimore. On March 8, 2010 Pittsburgh announced the re-signing of Gray to a new contract for the 2010 season.

References

External links
Riverhounds bio
Monmouth bio

1986 births
Living people
American soccer players
Jersey Express S.C. players
Pittsburgh Riverhounds SC players
Monmouth Hawks men's soccer players
Middletown High School South alumni
People from Middletown Township, New Jersey
People from Red Bank, New Jersey
Sportspeople from Monmouth County, New Jersey
Rutgers Scarlet Knights men's soccer players
USL Second Division players
USL Championship players
Sporting Kansas City draft picks
Soccer players from New Jersey
Association football midfielders